{{DISPLAYTITLE:C10H12ClNO}}
The molecular formula C10H12ClNO (molar mass: 197.66 g/mol, exact mass: 197.0607 u) may refer to:

 Beclamide
 3-Chloromethcathinone
 4-Chloromethcathinone

Molecular formulas